Carola "Lola" Costa (England, 1903 – Florence, 2004) was an English painter, writer and poet.

Early life
Although born in England, her parents were not native Britons. Her father was a Ligurian businessman, descended from the counts 'Costa di Carmagnola', and her French mother grew up in Normandy. When her parents separated in the early 1920s, Costa accompanied her mother to Paris where they lived in relative poverty, heavily reliant on her mothers aristocratic friends, who Lola often sold paintings to. Costa spent much of her time painting the streets between working as a shop assistant until taken to Egypt by a French actress as her companion and lady-in-waiting. Costa arrived in Florence at the end of the 1920s after teaching English in Milan with the Berlitz school.

Personal life and relationships
Costa transferred to the Berlitz Florentine branch and became a private tutor. She began tutoring the Tuscan artist Federigo Angeli, soon becoming his muse, and then married in 1932. The couple moved to the watch tower turned Villa il Palmerino, which once belonging to another English adoptive Florentine, the writer Vernon Lee. Costa took the Tuscan landscape surrounding the Villa, which was to be her home until her death, as one of her favourite subjects and frequent settings to her paintings of family and friends.

Costa and her husband swiftly became immersed in the Florentine artistic milieu; among her friends was Elisabeth Chaplin, another English expatriate artist living in Florence, as well as the Spanish-born avant-garde painters Antonio and Xavier Bueno.

She remained in Italy for the rest of her long life.

Career
Costa's favoured subject matter rested in the everyday. Despite a strong sense of spirituality, being a devout Catholic, she rarely attempted religious paintings. Her son Giuliano summarised her approach to painting, as a "spiritual practice in itself".
Her work was displayed in her lifetime in exhibitions promoted by the 'Regional Fascist Syndicate of the Fine Arts'. However she rarely made big sales, as she often preferred to gift her paintings.

She was experimental in her medium; using tempera, gouache and water colour as well as oils.

Similarly her style of painting varied, showing visibly the influence of different contemporary European movements; from the vivid colours of fauvism to the incisive strokes of German expressionism. The warm light of the Tuscan country side was also a clear influence on her chromatic palette.

Painting was not however her sole creative outlet. She also wrote prose and poetry.

Published works:

References

1903 births
2004 deaths
20th-century English painters
20th-century English poets
20th-century English women artists
20th-century English women writers
English women painters
English women poets
British expatriates in Italy
English people of Italian descent
English people of French descent
Painters from Florence
British expatriates in France
British expatriates in Egypt